Ranganathapuram is a village in the Marakkanam taluk of Villupuram district, India.  It is located 2 km from Agarapettai and about 2 km from Thirukattupalli.  The village is famous for the Tiruvaneshwar Temple.

Population 
According to the 2001 census, the village had a population of 528 with 279 men and 249 women in 127 households.  The sex ratio was .892.  The literacy rate was 81.09.

References 

Villages in Thanjavur district